Nazareth Academy is a Roman Catholic college-preparatory high school located in LaGrange Park, Illinois, United States, in the Roman Catholic Archdiocese of Chicago. It was founded in 1900 by the Sisters of St. Joseph.

Academics
Students take courses at any of three levels: college prep, honors, or Advanced Placement (AP).

Nazareth's average ACT score is  25.6. The top quarter of the class of 2016 averaged a score of 31.

Athletics
Nazareth Academy offers  23 interscholastic sports. 
						
Nazareth competes in the ESCC-East Suburban Catholic Conference and is a member of the Illinois High School Association.  In support of IHSA policies, Nazareth Academy may not promise or offer athletic scholarships of any kind.  Violations may result in loss of eligibility for the student, coach and/or school.

The school's teams have finished in the top four of the following IHSA sponsored state championship tournaments or meets.

 Baseball:  State Champions (2021–22), 2nd place (2014–15), 3rd place (2011–12, 2017–18), 4th place (2010–11) 
 Football:  State Champions (2014–15, 2015–16, 2018–19, 2022–23), 2nd place (2017–18, 2019–20)
 Softball:  4th place (2016–17)
 Basketball (Girls):  State Champions (2022–23), 2nd place (2017–18, 2021–22), 3rd place (2018–19)
 Golf (Boys): 4th place (2018–19)
 Volleyball (Girls): State Champions (2021–22), 2nd place (2022–23), 3rd place (2019–20)

Alumni
 Virginia C. Bulat (class of 1956), author and historian, history of Illinois and Cook County, Illinois
 Jeannie Klisiewicz (class of 2004), The Ellen DeGeneres Show Television Producer 
 Julian Love (class of 2016), NFL player for the New York Giants
 J. J. McCarthy (2017-2020), College football quarterback for the University of Michigan.

References

External links
 Nazareth Athletics website
 Nazareth Alumni website

Educational institutions established in 1900
Roman Catholic Archdiocese of Chicago
Catholic secondary schools in Illinois
Private high schools in Cook County, Illinois
1900 establishments in Illinois